Muellerella erratica is a species of lichenicolous fungus in the family Verrucariaceae. It has been reported from numerous countries, including India. Known host species include the thallus of Lecidea lapicida and Lecanora.

References

Verrucariales
Fungi described in 1855
Fungi of India
Lichenicolous fungi
Taxa named by Abramo Bartolommeo Massalongo